Casper's Scare School (also known as Casper's Scare School: The Movie) is a 2006 computer animated television film based on the Harvey Comics cartoon character Casper the Friendly Ghost. The film premiered on Cartoon Network on October 20, 2006. It was produced by Classic Media. A TV series of the same name was produced in 2009, as well as a 2008 video game of the same name.

Plot
As a result of Casper being too friendly with a boy named Jimmy Bradley and failing to scare enough humans Kibosh: The King of the Underworld has Casper enrolled into a Scare School, to prevent him from being banished into the Valley of the Shadows, headed by the two-headed headmaster Alder and Dash. At Scare School he befriends Ra, a mummy with unraveling issues and Mantha, a zombie girl who keeps falling apart, as well as Cappy, a pirate who takes them to the school, and his parrot Beaky.

There they learn to keep the Balance between scaring "fleshies" too often or too little both of which, the staff believe, would cause them to rise up and dominate the creatures of the Underworld. His first three lessons result in Casper being given detention from the teachers. The school bully, a vampire, named Thatch and his cronies spy on Casper in an attempt to sabotage him.

Casper feels unable to cope with having to be scary so he decides to go to the Valley of the Shadows by himself believing the Balance would have to go without him. Upon his arrival Casper finds the Valley to be a colorful garden and he meets his great-aunt Spitzy, who the Ghostly Trio claimed were not allowed to talk about, and the other creatures who were banished there for refusing to scare humans.

Meanwhile, Alder and Dash plot to use a petrification potion to turn Kibosh into stone and take over the Underworld and Deedstown. They test the potion on the Ghostly Trio, who arrive to meet the headmaster(s) after Casper's disappearance, before inviting Kibosh. When Casper's friends discover this they go to the Valley of the Shadows to warn him. Upon their arrival they discover that they can leave the Valley although the residents believe they cannot and had never even tried to. Casper then goes to Deedstown with his friends to stop Alder and Dash in their plot.

The headmasters are convinced to stop by their "ancle" (aunt and uncle in one) Belle and Murray, from the Valley of the Shadows, and when everyone is returned to their original forms Kibosh allows the creatures to be friends with "fleshies" every once in a while. Kibosh confides in Casper that he once had two human friends and shows him a photograph. He tells him that being scary and growing up is hard, but he has confidence in Casper. Meanwhile, Cappy and Beaky soar over the soccer field while Thatch swabs the deck as punishment for his actions.

Cast
Devon Werkheiser - Casper, Casper's Shadow
Brett DelBuono - Jimmy Bradley
Kendre Berry - Ra
Christy Carlson Romano - Mantha
James Belushi - Alder
Bob Saget - Dash
Matthew Underwood - Thatch
Kevin Michael Richardson - Kibosh
Dan Castellaneta - Stretch
Billy West - Fatso, Figurehead
John DiMaggio - Stinkie, Frankengymteacher 
Debi Derryberry - Banana Lady, History Teacher, Additional Voices
Scott Menville - Punk Kid, Scare Center Host 2, Pumpkinhead, Braniac, Poolguy, Hunchback, Additional Voices
Pat Fraley - Scare Center Host 1, Wolfie, Narrator, Werewolf, Additional Voices
Jason Harris - Gargoyle, Flyboy, Skinny Goast, Coach, Additional Voices
Candi Milo - Mickey
Nika Futterman - Monaco
Maurice LaMarche - Cappy, Thurdigree Burns
Kevin McDonald - Beaky
John Kassir - P.A Voice, Additional Voices
Danny Cooksey - Additional Voices
Fred Tatasciore - Additional Voices
Phyllis Diller - Aunt Spitzy
Captain & Tennille - Maurry and Belle, Alder and Dash's "Ancle"

Characters

Television series

Comic book
Ape Entertainment published a Casper's Scare School comic book that ran for two issues from October 2011 to June 2012.

See also
List of ghost films

References

External links
 

2006 computer-animated films
2006 television films
2006 films
2000s children's comedy films
2006 fantasy films
2000s ghost films
American children's animated fantasy films
American comedy horror films
American fantasy comedy films
Casper the Friendly Ghost films
Casper the Friendly Ghost
Films based on American comics
Films based on Harvey Comics
2000s children's animated films
Animated films about dragons
2000s children's fantasy films
2006 comedy films
American drama television films
2000s American films